Tobacco virtovirus 1, informally called Tobacco mosaic satellite virus, Satellite tobacco mosaic virus (STMV), or tobacco mosaic satellite virus, is a satellite virus first reported in Nicotiana glauca from southern California, U.S.. Its genome consists of linear positive-sense single-stranded RNA.

Tobacco virtovirus 1 is a small, icosahedral plant virus which worsens the symptoms of infection by Tobacco mosaic virus (TMV). Satellite viruses are some of the smallest possible reproducing units in nature; they achieve this by relying on both the host cell and a host virus (in this case, TMV) for the machinery necessary for them to reproduce. The entire Tobacco virtovirus 1 particle consists of 60 identical copies of a single protein (CP) that make up the viral capsid (coating), and a 1063-nucleotide single-stranded RNA genome which codes for the capsid and one other protein of unknown function.

References

Further reading

 
 Virtovirus on ViralZone

Positive-sense single-stranded RNA viruses
Riboviria
Tobacco diseases
Viral plant pathogens and diseases
Satellite viruses